Matney may refer to:

Eddie Matney, American chef, restaurateur and television personality
Marc Matney (born 1963), American voice actor
Robert Matney (born 1976), American actor
Matney Peak, a peak in the Heritage Range of the Ellsworth Mountains, Antarctica